Grêmio F.B.P.A. Academy is the youth set up of Grêmio. Is composed of several youth teams from the age group of under-7 to the under-20, and is considered one of the most prolific football academies in Brazil as also in the world.

Notable academy graduates in recent years include 2002 FIFA World Cup winner and two-time FIFA Ballon d'Or recipient Ronaldinho Gaúcho, Grêmio midfielder Lucas Leiva, LA Galaxy winger Douglas Costa, UEFA Champions League winner midfielder Anderson, Liverpool midfielder Arthur, Flamengo winger Everton, 2016 Summer Olympic Games Gold Medal and Corinthians forward Luan, alongside many first team players, such as forward Ferreira and midfielder Bitello.

The club has a large academy training complex, named CT Presidente Hélio Dourado, based in Eldorado do Sul, in the metropolitan area of Porto Alegre, which includes a small stadium where all the youth teams play their home matches.

Under-20
The under-20 team, also known as juniores, is made up mostly of under-20 players who have reached the last senior year beneath the professional level, and provides further development for players before joining the transition team or the first team. During the season, the under-20 regularly plays in the state league and also in national and international competitions, such as the Taça Belo Horizonte de Futebol Júnior, Copa São Paulo de Futebol Júnior, Campeonato Brasileiro Sub-20, Torneo di Viareggio, among others. The current head coach is Airton Fagundes.

Under-20 squad

Staff
 Head coach: Airton Fagundes
 Assistant coach: João Antônio
 Goalkeeper coach: Humberto Flores

Under-17
The under-17 team, also as Juvenil, is formed by players aged until 17-years old, being the last step before reaching the under-19 and under-20 (junior) levels. During the season, competes regularly in the first tier of the Campeonato Gaúcho Sub-17 and national competitions such as the Copa do Brasil Sub-17, Copa Santiago de Futebol Juvenil, among international competitions as well.

Under-17 squad

Staff
 Head coach: 
 Assistant coach: Emanuel Freitas
 Fitness coach: João Paulo Ribeiro

Honours

U-23

International
"China-Latin American Cup 2017" International Football Tournament (CHN): 1
 2017

National
Campeonato Brasileiro de Aspirantes: 1
 2021

U-20

International
Blue Stars/FIFA Youth Cup (SWI): 1
 2001
 Runners-up: 2002

Trofeo Angelo Dossena (ITA): 1
 2008

Torneio Internacional de Monthey (SWI): 1
 2002

Copa Rio Grande do Sul de Futebol Sub-20 (BRA): 1
 2019

National
Campeonato Brasileiro Sub-20: 2
 2008, 2009
 Runners-up: 2006

Taça Belo Horizonte de Futebol Júnior: 2
 2008, 2012
 Runners-up: 1985, 1986

Regional
Taça Cidade de Londrina (PR): 1
 1990

Campeonato Gaúcho Sub-20: 7
 1996, 1999, 2000, 2005, 2006, 2007, 2014
 Runners-up: 1991, 1992, 1994, 1998, 2012, 2018

U-19

Regional
Copa FGF Sub-19: 1
 2012
 Runners-up: 2013

U-18

International
SBS Cup International Youth Soccer (JAP): 1
 1996

Copa da Amizade (JAP): 1
 2005

Copa Mitad Del Mundo (ECU): 1
 2018

U-17

International
Raiffeisenbank Vorallgäu Cup (GER): 1
 2012

Torneo Las Américas (COL): 1
 2019

Copa Santiago de Futebol Juvenil (BRA): 7
 1995, 1996, 1997, 1998, 2000, 2008, 2019
 Runners-up: 1989, 1991, 1993, 2001, 2005, 2017

National
Copa Macaé de Futebol Sub-17: 1
 2004

Torneio Super Brasileirinho de Futebol/Copa Eucatur: 1
 2007

Aldeia International Cup: 1
 2019

Regional
Campeonato Gaúcho Sub-17: 10
 1993, 1994, 1995, 1996, 2001, 2002, 2003, 2009, 2014, 2015
 Runners-up: 1997, 1999, 2000, 2005, 2006, 2007 e 2008

Copa FGF Sub-17: 1
 2010

Copa Dênis Lawson: 1
 2005

U-16

SC Cup (3): 2000, 2001, 2010
Copa Carpina (PE) (1): 2012
Copa Paraná (2): 1996, 1997
Quadrangular de Futebol de Cotia (SP) (1): 2016
Campeonato Gaúcho Sub-16 (1): 2014
Copa Teutônia Adidas (RS) (8): 2008, 2009

U-15

Copa Brasil de Futebol Infantil Votorantim (SP) (2): 2008, 2010
Copa Brasil de Futebol Infantil Londrina (PR) (2): 2002, 2007
Copa Brasil de Futebol Infantil Laranjal Paulista (PR) (1): 1998
Copa da Amizade Brasil e Japão (1): 2017
BH Youth Cup (MG) (1): 2012
Campeonato 'Base Brasil 2020' (BRA) (1): 2017
Copa Lages de Futebol (SC) (1): 2013
Copa dos Campeões (PR) (1): 2007
Campeonato Gaúcho Sub-15 (8): 2001, 2002, 2004, 2009, 2012, 2013, 2014, 2015
Campeonato Gaúcho - Noligafi (1): 2012
Taça da Amizade de Futebol Roca Sales	(RS) (2): 2005, 2006
Copa Mellita (RS) (2): 1997, 1998

U-14

Mundialito de Futebol Infantil (URU) (1): 2007
Mundialito de Futebol Infantil - Copa Cidade de Maracaibo (VEN) (1): 2007
Quadrangular de Futebol de Cotia (SP) (1): 2016
Copa Nacional de Futebol Vale do Piquiri (PR) (1): 2008
Campeonato Gaúcho - Noligafi (2): 2012, 2016
Copa Internacional de Flores da Cunha (RS) (1):2004

U-13

IberCup World-Cascais (POR) (1): 2017
Efipan (5): 1985, 2006, 2010, 2014, 2016
Torneo de Futbol Infantil Valesanito (ARG) (1): 2017
Torneo Internacional Primavera Roja (URU) (1): 2017
Copa Cidade Verde (BRA) (1): 2018
BGprime League (SC) (1): 2017
Taça Saudades de Futebol (SC) (1): 2008
Copa Cidade de São Ludgero (SC) (1): 2016
Copa dos Campeões (PR) (1): 2007
Campeonato Gaúcho - Noligafi (6): 2012, 2013, 2014, 2015, 2016, 2017
Copa Sul Brasileira (RS) (2): 2008, 2010
Copa Teutônia Adidas (RS) (2): 2008, 2009
Copa Nova Prata de Futebol (RS) (1): 2009
Taça Cidade de São Gabriel (RS) (1): 2008
Copa Nova Bréscia de Futebol (RS) (1): 2007

U-12

Go Cup (BRA) (1): 2018
Torneo Argentinito de San Carlos (ARG) (1): 2017
Copa Cidade Verde (BRA) (6): 2007, 2012, 2013, 2014, 2015, 2016
Taça Brasil de Campo Bom (RS) (1): 2018
Copa Nacional de Futebol Vale do Piquiri (PR) (1): 2008
Campeonato Gaúcho - Noligafi (3): 2014, 2015, 2017
Copa Sarandi (RS) (1): 2017
Taça Cidade de Tuparendi (RS) (1): 2017
Copa Teutônia Adidas (RS) (1): 2011
Copa Nova Prata de Futebol (RS) (1): 2009
Copa Nova Bréscia de Futebol (RS) (1): 2007
Copa Sinodal Progresso de Montenegro (RS) (1): 2007

U-11

Torneio Confraternidad Deportiva (URU) (1): 2013
Torneo de Futbol Infantil Valesanito (ARG) (1): 2017
Torneio Internacional de Fútbol Infantil Esperanzas Pritty (ARG) (1): 2011
Efipan de Primavera (3): 2011, 2014, 2016
Go Cup (BRA) (1): 2017
Copa Cidade Verde (BRA) (7): 2010, 2011, 2012, 2014, 2015, 2016, 2017
Taça Saudades de Futebol (SC) (6): 2006, 2007, 2009, 2010, 2012, 2014
Copa Cidade de São Ludgero (SC) (2): 2016, 2017
Copa dos Campeões (PR) (1): 2007
Campeonato Gaúcho - Noligafi (3): 2014, 2016, 2017
Copa Pequeno Gigante (RS) (1): 2018
Torneio Internacional Cidade de Uruguaiana (RS) (1): 2011
Taça Ijuí (RS) (1): 2013
Sul Cup (RS) (1): 2008

U-10

Torneo Argentinito de San Carlos (ARG) (1): 2017
Torneio Confraternidad Deportiva (URU) (1): 2013
Copa Cidade Verde (BRA) (3): 2016, 2017, 2018
Campeonato Gaúcho - Noligafi (4): 2013, 2015, 2016, 2017
Copa Pequeno Gigante (RS) (1): 2018
Taça Cidade de Tuparendi (RS) (2): 2015, 2017
Torneio de Base GE Sandense (RS) (2): 2013, 2016
Taça Ijuí (RS) (1): 2013
Sul Cup (RS) (1): 2008

References

Grêmio Foot-Ball Porto Alegrense
Football academies in Brazil